Aleksandr Vladimirovich Maksimenko (born 19 March 1998) is a Russian football player who plays for FC Spartak Moscow.

Club career
He made his debut in the Russian Football National League for FC Spartak-2 Moscow on 13 August 2016 in a game against FC Tyumen. He made his debut for the main Spartak squad on 25 October 2017 in a Russian Cup game against PFC Spartak Nalchik.

He made his debut in the Russian Premier League for FC Spartak Moscow on 28 July 2018 in a game against FC Orenburg. He became the starting Spartak goalkeeper after that in the beginning of the 2018–19 season over Artyom Rebrov as Aleksandr Selikhov was suffering from a tendon injury.

He won the 2022-23 Russian Cup as the first-choice goalkeeper.

International career
He played in the 2015 UEFA European Under-17 Championship and 2015 FIFA U-17 World Cup for Russia national under-17 football team.

On 11 May 2021, he was named as a back-up player for the Russia's UEFA Euro 2020 squad.

Honours
Spartak Moscow
Russian Cup: 2021–22

Career statistics

References

External links
 Profile by Russian Football National League

1998 births
Sportspeople from Rostov-on-Don
Russian people of Ukrainian descent
Living people
Russian footballers
Association football goalkeepers
Russia youth international footballers
Russia under-21 international footballers
FC Spartak-2 Moscow players
FC Spartak Moscow players
Russian Premier League players
Russian First League players